McKay Lake may refer to:

McKay Lake (Minnesota)
McKay Lake (Ottawa), a lake in Ottawa, Ontario
McKay Lake (Pic River), a lake in Thunder Bay District, Ontario